Albanian hip hop refers to hip hop from artists from Albania, Kosovo, North Macedonia and surrounding areas where the Albanian language is spoken. Albanian hip hop may also refer to hip hop from the Albanian diaspora in other countries and in other languages.

References

 

pt:Hip hop americano
sv:Amerikansk hiphop